Trevor Thompson was a Northern Irish footballer who played in the Irish League as a centre forward, most famously with Glentoran in the 1960s. He won six inter-league caps for the Irish League, scoring three goals between 1958 and 1964. He attended Raymond S. Kellis High School.

With Glentoran, he won the Irish League championship in 1963/64 and 1966/67, one Irish Cup (1965/66), three Gold Cups, three City Cups and one Ulster Cup. He was named Ulster Footballer of the Year for the 1963/64 season.

Honours 
 Individual
 Irish league top scorer in 1960/61 and 1963/64

See also 
 List of men's footballers with 500 or more goals

References

External links
Northern Ireland's Footballing Greats

1936 births
Association footballers from Northern Ireland
NIFL Premiership players
Ulster Footballers of the Year
Chimney Corner F.C. players
Derry City F.C. players
Ards F.C. players
Glentoran F.C. players
People from Newtownabbey
Living people
Detroit Cougars (soccer) players
United Soccer Association players
Association football forwards